The National Center for High-Performance Computing (NCHC) is one of ten national-level research laboratories under National Applied Research Laboratories (NARL), headquartered at Hsinchu Science and Industrial Park, Hsinchu City, Taiwan. The NCHC is Taiwan's primary facility for high performance computing (HPC) resources including large-scale computational science and engineering, cluster and grid computing, middleware development, visualization and virtual reality, data storage, networking, and HPC-related training. The NCHC is also responsible for the operation of the 20 Gbit/s Taiwan Advanced Research and Education Network (TWAREN), the national education and research network of Taiwan. The NCHC supports local academia and industry with hardware and software, advanced research and application development, and professional training.

History
The research center was opened in 1993. In November 2018 the National Center for High-Performance Computing owned supercomputer Taiwania 2 debuted at number 20 on the top500 list of fastest supercomputers.

List of supercomputers 

 Formosa 4
 Formosa 5
 ALPS
 Taiwania (supercomputer)
 Taiwania 2
 Taiwania 3

Branches
 Hsinchu HQ
 Taichung
 Tainan

See also
 Ministry of Science and Technology (Republic of China)
 Taiwan Semiconductor Research Institute
 Industrial Technology Research Institute
 Taiwania (supercomputer)
 Taiwania 3 (supercomputer)

References

External links
 
 

1993 establishments in Taiwan
Research institutes in Taiwan
Supercomputer sites
Internet mirror services